Palifer is a genus of corticioid fungi in the Schizoporaceae family. Circumscribed in 1991, the widely distributed genus contain four species.

References

External links

Hymenochaetales
Agaricomycetes genera